Pavel Nikolayevich Grudinin (born 20 October 1960) is a Russian politician and entrepreneur. Previously, he was a Municipal Deputy of the city settlement Vidnoye and Chairman of the Council of Deputies 2017 to 2019.

Grudinin was the Communist Party of the Russian Federation's candidate for the 2018 Russian presidential election, but was defeated by the incumbent president Vladimir Putin.

Life and career
Grudinin was born in Moscow, to Nikolai Konstantinovich Grudinin and Serafima Zinovievna Grudinina (née Pishchik), both agricultural workers who met while studying at the Moscow Timiryazev Agricultural Academy. In 1961 they were sent to the Leninsky District, Moscow Oblast to work at the Lenin Sovkhoz. According to Grudinin, his sister, grandmother and son, his aunts, uncles and cousins all worked in the same sovkhoz on different levels, and their "dynasty spent over 250 years in total working" there.

His paternal grandparents were from the Vologda Governorate. His father was born in the Gryazovetsky District and grew up in Vologda. His maternal grandfather was Jewish, from the Volgograd Oblast, who moved to Leningrad and married an ethnic Russian woman; he served as a tank commander during the Great Patriotic War and was declared missing in action in 1944. Grudinin identifies himself as Russian. He belongs to Russian Orthodoxy, but criticizes current ROC for "interference in temporal affairs".

After graduating from school in 1977 he entered the Moscow State Agroengineering University as a mechanical engineer, and graduated in 1982. After graduating he began working at the Lenin State Farm (sovkhoz), where many members of his family had already been employed. From 1982 to 1989 he worked there as head of the mechanical workshop, from 1990 to 1995 as deputy director. In 1995 he became the general director of newly formed privately held company ZAO Lenin State Farm, where he also got the blocking shareholding. Grudinin characterized the cooperative farm as a "socialist enterprise". The farm produces dairy, various fruit, and vegetables. The farm grants various services to residents, such as medical care and education.

Political career
Since 1997, he was elected three times as a deputy of the Moscow Oblast Duma, where he successfully worked until 2011. In 2001 he graduated from the Russian Academy of Public Administration under the President of the Russian Federation, majoring in jurisprudence.

In 2017, he was elected Municipal Deputy of the settlement city Vidnoye. On 9 October 2017, Grudinin was elected Speaker of the Council of Deputies. On 14 February 2019, the Council of Deputies removed Pavel Grudinin from the post of Speaker. And on 26 February, the Council of Deputies dismissed Grudinin from a position of the Deputy.

On 14 March 2019, the Communist Party of the Russian Federation (CPRF) decided to give Grudinin the seat in the State Duma of Zhores Alferov, who died on 1 March 2019. On 21 March, the Central Election Commission (CEC) refused Grudinin because of uncovered foreign accounts. This decision caused a negative reaction from the CPRF. On 23 March, Communists protests took place across the country, one of the goals of which was to support Grudinin.

On 24 July 2021, the CEC barred Grudinin from running for the State Duma in the 2021 Russian legislative election, accusing him of owning shares in a company registered in the country of Belize, where the electoral law formally forbids parliamentary candidates from owning offshore assets. Grudinin denied the charge and said: "The (Communist) Party is an opposition party... Someone is afraid of the big effect that a union of left-wing forces could have". Zyuganov vowed to appeal the decision to the Supreme Court.

2018 presidential campaign

On 23 December 2017, at the XVII Congress of the Communist Party of the Russian Federation, Grudinin was nominated as presidential candidate. It was also announced that his campaign headquarters will be headed by Gennady Zyuganov.

Grudinin's nomination was criticized by many left-wing politicians, in particular, Sergey Mironov, Maxim Suraykin, Boris Kagarlitsky and others. The main reasons for criticism is that Grudinin is a businessman, that he is representative of the "bourgeois class" which Communism is ideologically opposed to, and that Pavel Grudinin previously was a member of United Russia party. In addition, criticism of Grudinin intensified when he was revealed to have uncovered foreign bank accounts.

During his campaign, Grudinin visited a total of 11 federal subjects, in addition to his home Moscow Oblast. On all trips, he met with voters, gave press conferences and visited various businesses.

At the election, Grudinin won 11.8% of the vote, losing to Putin.

2024 presidential candidacy

On 14 November 2019, Grudinin announced that he intends to run for president again in 2024. In case of victory, Grudinin promised to dissolve the State Duma and nationalize the proceeds obtained illegally. Grudinin said that he would seek the nomination of the Communist Party of the Russian Federation, while if the party nominates another candidate, Grudinin would be ready to support him.

Personal life
Grudinin was married and has two adult sons.

On 16 July 2018, Grudinin divorced his wife Irina through the court. The reason for the divorce was adultery of Grudinin, long concealed from his wife's relationship on the side and kept a second family. In addition to the official family, Grudinin was in a relationship with Ksenia Kutyukhina, who bore him two more daughters in 2012 and 2014.

Electoral history

2018 presidential election

Awards and titles
He was awarded the medal In Commemoration of the 850th Anniversary of Moscow, Thanks to the President of the Russian Federation, an honorary diploma of the State Duma. He has the title of Honored Worker of Agriculture of the Russian Federation.

References

External links 
Pavel Grudinin presidential campaign website
Pavel Grudinin presidential campaign Facebook
Pavel Grudinin presidential campaign Twitter
Pavel Grudinin presidential campaign YouTube
 Кандидат в президенты Павел Грудинин
 Павел Грудинин (биография)

1960 births
21st-century Russian politicians
Living people
Politicians from Moscow
Candidates in the 2018 Russian presidential election
Communist Party of the Russian Federation presidential nominees
Russian people of Jewish descent
Businesspeople from Moscow
Russian communists
Russian socialists
Russian Orthodox Christians from Russia
United Russia politicians
Russian food industry businesspeople